A Jolly Good Fellow (2008) is a novel by American author Stephen V. Masse.

Plot introduction
A fake charity Santa Claus plots to kidnap the eleven-year-old son of a State Representative, but the plot goes topsy-turvy when the boy decides to run away from home by hitchhiking.

Plot summary

Two weeks before Christmas in Boston, Duncan Wagner, a lone down-and-outer who has been 
living in self-imposed exile for several years, kidnaps Gabriel Booker, the eleven-year-old
son of State Representative Winthrop Booker. Wagner takes the child to his apartment and 
ties him to a chair in front of the television, then leaves for work as a self-employed 
charity Santa Claus. When Wagner returns to his apartment, Gabriel is no longer in the 
chair. Thinking the boy has fled, Wagner goes into his room and finds him sleeping on the 
bed.

In spite of a lingering edginess, the two grow more cordial toward each other. Wagner 
locks Gabriel’s ankle to a long chain to make sure he doesn’t run away. Gabriel hounds 
Wagner to supply him with Christmas decorations and other goodies to help pass the time. 
Wagner awkwardly complies. Gabriel turns out to be a vegetarian. And a bed wetter.

After a day, Wagner makes a ransom demand for one hundred thousand dollars from 
Representative Booker. Almost immediately the missing child case turns into an 
Amber Alert and dominates news headlines.

One night Wagner, bothered by the clinking sound of the chain, unlocks Gabriel’s ankle 
in order to have a decent sleep. In the morning, Gabriel is gone and with him, all Duncan’s 
charity money. Duncan goes to town in his Santa suit, hoping to elude hoards of police he 
is sure will swarm to his apartment. While in town, he helps a street artist, Martina, 
whose purse is being rifled by a pair of thieves. He realizes Martina has an eye for his 
Santa character, though he also realizes that by kidnapping Gabriel, he has imprisoned 
himself as well.

Back at his apartment there are no police. Later on, Gabriel shows up in disguise after spending the day exploring Boston and buying money orders with Duncan's cash. The friendship is solidified, although the ransom deal seems to be going sour...

The real story is the relationship between Duncan and Gabriel, which takes surprising but endearing turns.

Awards and nominations
 2008 Independent Publisher Book Awards, silver medal (U.S. North-East - Best Regional Fiction)
 2008 New England Book Festival, honorable mention (Best books of the holiday season/fiction)
 2009 Allbooks Review Editor’s Choice Award 2nd place nominee (Mystery/Suspense)

Publication history
 2008, USA, Good Harbor Press     Paperback
 2008, USA,    Calderwood Books                     Electronic Book

External links 
 Good Harbor Press 
 Calderwood Books 
 2008 Independent Publisher Awards 
 2008 New England Book Festival 
 2009 Allbooks Review Editor's Choice Awards Finalist 

2008 American novels
Christmas novels
Novels set in Boston